Beatriz Londoño Soto, M.D. (born 1959) is a Colombian physician and administrative politician who previously served as the Ambassador of Colombia to Switzerland and as the 2nd Minister of Health and Social Protection of Colombia in the Administration of President Juan Manuel Santos Calderón. She had previously served as Deputy Minister of Health and Welfare under the administration of her predecessor from 2010 to 2011, and as Director of the Colombian Family Welfare Institute from 2002 to 2006.

Ambassadorship
On 19 March 2013 President Juan Manuel Santos Calderón appointed Londoño Ambassador of Colombia to Switzerland. She presented her Letters of Credence to the President of the Swiss Confederation, Ueli Maurer, and the Federal Chancellor of Switzerland, Corina Casanova, at a ceremony at the Federal Palace on 26 March 2013.

References

1959 births
Living people
Pontifical Bolivarian University alumni
Harvard School of Public Health alumni
Colombian healthcare managers
Women government ministers of Colombia
Ministers of Health and Social Protection of Colombia
Ambassadors of Colombia to Switzerland
Ambassadors of Colombia to Liechtenstein
People from Medellín
Colombian women ambassadors